Naria poraria, common name the purple-based cowry or porous cowry, is a species of sea snail, a cowry, a marine gastropod mollusk in the family Cypraeidae, the cowries.

Description
The surface of the shell is smooth and shiny, the colors usually range from pale brown to dark brown, with numerous small yellowish spots. The base and the margins are purple (hence the common name), while the teeth are commonly white. In the living cowries the mantle is bright red or purplish, with quite long and slightly tree-shaped sensorial papillae. The lateral flaps of the mantle may hide completely the shell surface and may be quickly retracted into the shell opening. Naria poraria is quite similar to Naria albuginosa, but in the second cowry the purple color of the base is paler.

Distribution
This species is widely distributed throughout most of the Indo-Pacific, along East Africa (Somalia, Aldabra, Kenya, the Mascarene Basin, Mauritius, Réunion and Tanzania), in the Indian Ocean and in the Pacific Ocean (Chagos, the Seychelles, Sri Lanka, India, Malaysia, Indonesia, New South Wales, New Caledonia, Philippines, Samar Island, Polynesia, Marshall Islands and Hawaii).

Habitat
It is commonly found on dead corals, under large rocks or in caves.

References

 Verdcourt, B. (1954). "The cowries of the East African Coast (Kenya, Tanganyika, Zanzibar and Pemba)". Journal of the East Africa Natural History Society 22(4) 96: 129–144, 17 pls.
 Burgess, C. M. (1970). The Living Cowries. AS Barnes and Co, Ltd. Cranbury, New Jersey

External links
 Gastropods
 Erosaria poraria
 Clade
 Biolib
 Cypraea.eu

Cypraeidae
Gastropods described in 1758
Taxa named by Carl Linnaeus